Ricardo López Nava (born July 25, 1966) is a Mexican former professional boxer who competed from 1985 to 2001. He was a two-weight world champion, having held the WBC mini flyweight title from 1990 to 1998, defending it against a record-breaking 21 opponents; the WBA and WBO mini flyweight titles between 1997 and 1998; and the IBF junior flyweight title from 1999 until his retirement in 2001. He is one of just fifteen world boxing champions to retire without a loss. He is the father of undefeated former boxer Alonso López.

Amateur career 
López would win four consecutive Guantes de Oro de México Championships from 1981 to 1984. He turned pro without having ever lost an amateur bout and is now known as one of the best amateur boxers to ever step in the ring.

Professional career 
On January 18, 1985, Ricardo made his professional debut at the age of 18 by scoring a third-round knockout of Rogelio Hernandez. He accumulated a record of 26–0 before receiving his first shot at a world title.

WBC mini flyweight champion 
On October 10, 1990, López defeated WBC and lineal mini flyweight champion Hideyuki Ohashi of Japan via fifth-round knockout to win his first world title. In 1991, he defeated Korean former champion Kyung-Yung Lee (20–1) via Unanimous Decision. In 1992, he defended his title against
Pretty Boy Lucas (22–2–2) of the Philippines via Unanimous Decision and Rocky Lin (14–0) of Taiwan via TKO. López started 1993 with a stoppage victory over amateur standout Kwang-Soo Oh and followed it with a knockout over future two-time champion Saman Sorjaturong of Thailand. Sorjaturong was knocked down once in the first round and twice in the second round before the referee stopped the bout.

Later that year, he knocked out Filipino former champion Manny Melchor in the eleventh round. In his tenth title defense, López defeated future champion Kermin Guardia (21–0) by unanimous decision. He knocked out Surachai Saengmorakot (10–0) in the first round of his next bout. In 1995, he defeated Andy Tabanas (30–2) of the Philippines via twelfth-round knockout. In his next bout, he defeated another Filipino boxer and founder of the famous "Ala Gym" Ala Villamor (29–1–1) by knockout. In early 1997, there had been a plan in the works for López to move up in weight to challenge junior flyweight champion Michael Carbajal, however, the plan was upended when Carbajal lost his title in an upset loss. López would go on to defend his title against Mongkol Charoen (20–1).

WBO and WBA mini flyweight champion 
In his 20th world title bout, López unified his WBC title by defeating WBO mini flyweight champion Alex Sánchez (25–1) of Puerto Rico via fifth-round knockout. After López won the WBO title, he said he wanted to give his championship belt to his father, who is a boxing fan. His statement to Mexican newspapers prompted the organization to take away López' title and sanction a match between Eric Jamili and Mickey Cantwell to fill the vacancy. "It was enough for us," said the WBO president, Francisco Valcarcel, of López' intention. "That's a public resignation." Dwight Manley, López' agent, said López should have had a hearing before the WBO took away his title. "He got no letter, he got no telephone call," Manley said.

On March 7, 1998, López fought undefeated WBA mini flyweight champion Rosendo Álvarez to a technical draw after referee Arthur Mercante Sr. stopped the contest following an accidental clash of heads in the seventh round. In the rematch, Álvarez came in over the mini flyweight limit and was subsequently stripped of his title. Due to the weight disparity, the fight was in jeopardy. However, López chose to proceed with the contest against the heavier Álvarez with only López eligible to claim the now vacant WBA title. López defeated Álvarez by split decision to claim his third mini flyweight title. After the fight, he vacated his titles in order to move up in weight.

IBF junior flyweight champion 
In his first bout at junior flyweight, López defeated IBF champion Will Grigsby of the U.S. by Unanimous Decision. He defended his title against former champion Ratanapol Sor Vorapin by knocked out in the 3rd Round. On September 29, 2001, López knocked out Zolani Petelo, who had recently vacated his IBF mini flyweight title, the only mini flyweight title that López had not claimed before moving up in weight. He officially announced his retirement from boxing at a press conference on November 27, 2002, in Mexico City.

Retirement 
Ricardo López was the third champion in history to retire undefeated and the first to do so as both an amateur and professional fighter. He also shares with Joe Louis and Floyd Mayweather Jr. the record for most consecutive title bouts without a loss (twenty-six). This streak began with his knockout of Hideyuki Ohashi to win the WBC mini flyweight title in 1990 and ended with his knockout of Zolani Petelo to defend his IBF junior flyweight title in 2001. Ricardo only had one draw, which came against Rosendo Álvarez in 1998 in López's 48th bout and was avenged in the rematch eight months later. His final record was 51 wins (38 knockouts), 0 losses and 1 draw.

Life after boxing 
López now works as a boxing broadcaster for the Mexican Televisa network.

Honors 
López was inducted into the International Boxing Hall of Fame and World Boxing Hall of Fame in 2007.

Ricardo "El Finito" López was voted as the greatest Strawweight and Light Flyweight Champion ever by the Houston Boxing Hall Of Fame in 2014, while BoxRec rates him the best Minimumweight of all time. The Houston Boxing Hall Of Fame is a voting body composed entirely of current and former fighters.

Professional boxing record

See also 
List of minimumweight boxing champions
List of WBC world champions
List of WBO world champions
List of WBA world champions
List of IBF world champions
List of Mexican boxing world champions
List of people from Morelos, Mexico

References

External links 

Ricardo López - CBZ Profile

Mexican male boxers
Boxers from Morelos
Sportspeople from Cuernavaca
International Boxing Hall of Fame inductees
World Boxing Council champions
World Boxing Organization champions
World Boxing Association champions
International Boxing Federation champions
Light-flyweight boxers
World light-flyweight boxing champions
Mini-flyweight boxers
World mini-flyweight boxing champions
Undefeated world boxing champions
Boxers at the 1991 Pan American Games
1966 births
Living people
Pan American Games competitors for Mexico
20th-century Mexican people
21st-century Mexican people